Hawaii is an American police procedural crime drama television series produced and distributed by NBC Universal Television for the NBC television network. Originally titled Pearl City, this police drama was produced with the series Hawaii Five-O in mind, and debuted on September 1 and aired through October 6, 2004. Written by Executive Producer Jeff Eastin, the series revolves around a fictional elite crime unit of the Honolulu Police Department headed by veteran detective and local legend Sean Harrison (Michael Biehn) and John Declan (Sharif Atkins), a former Chicago Police Department detective transferred to Hawaii for his talents.

The series was written by Jeff Eastin, Chris Black, Reid Steiner, Wendy West, Eric Haywood, and Travis Romero.

The series was canceled in October 2004 and though eight episodes were filmed, only seven were aired.

Cast

Main 
Michael Biehn as Sean Harrison
Sharif Atkins as John Declan
Ivan Sergei as Danny Edwards
Eric Balfour as Christopher Gains
Aya Sumika as Linh Tamiya
Peter Navy Tuiasosopo as Kaleo
Cary-Hiroyuki Tagawa as Captain Terry Harada

Recurring 
Gina Philips as Harper Woods

Episodes

External links

2000s American crime drama television series
2000s American police procedural television series
2004 American television series debuts
2004 American television series endings
NBC original programming
Television series by Universal Television
Television shows set in Hawaii
Television shows filmed in Hawaii
Fictional portrayals of the Honolulu Police Department